The Shadow ministry of Tim Nicholls is the Liberal National Party opposition between May 2016 and December 2017, opposing the Palaszczuk government in the Parliament of Queensland. It was led by Tim Nicholls following his election as leader of the party and Opposition Leader on 6 May 2016. Deb Frecklington was the deputy party leader and Deputy Leader of the Opposition.

The current Shadow Ministry was announced on 8 May 2016. It succeeded the Springborg shadow ministry and was replaced by the Frecklington shadow ministry on 15 December 2017.

See also

2017 Queensland state election
First Palaszczuk Ministry

References

Nicholls